Niepokalanów monastery (so called City of the Immaculate Mother of God) is a Roman Catholic religious community in Teresin (42 km to the west from Warsaw), Poland founded in 1927 by Friar Minor Conventual Friar Maximilian Kolbe, who was later canonized as a saint-martyr of the Catholic Church.

Beginnings of the monastery 

In 1927 Prince Jan Drucki-Lubecki, son of Konstanty Drucki - Lubecki (commander of the Vilnius Cavalry Brigade) and Countess Maria Antonina Krasinski, offered Fr. Maximilian Kolbe a convenient ground near Warsaw for building a new monastery, later called Niepokalanów. In autumn of the same year the first wooden barracks were built and a consecration of the new monastery took place on 7 December 1927.

The facility served as a home for the Conventual brothers, a minor seminary and a volunteer fire department. It was also a centre for charitable ministry and evangelization through the radio programmes and the distribution of printed materials. In 1930 Father Kolbe founded a similar community in Nagasaki (Japan), called Mugenzai no Sono (無原罪の園:Garden of the Immaculate).

Quick growth of the Niepokalanów required more and more space, so the area of the monastery reached 28 ha. Before the Second World War broke out, it was the largest monastery in the world, housing as many as 760 men. One of the magazines, The Knight of the Immaculate, countered religious apathy and had a press run of 750,000 copies a month. The whole publishing house used about 1600 tonnes of paper annually for about 60 million copies of papers.

The time of war 
During the Second World War, the monastery provided shelter for many soldiers, injured in the September Campaign and also for refugees, regardless of their nationality or religion (e. g. to approximately 1,500 Jewish refugees from western Poland). Father Maximilian Kolbe, together with four other Franciscans, was arrested by the Gestapo and he was murdered in Auschwitz concentration camp in 1941 when he chose to sacrifice his life so another would live. In the end of the war (January 1945) during heavy bombardment of Niepokalanów, six friars were killed, some others injured and many of the buildings of the monastery were destroyed.

That time the media evangelisation was forbidden (with the only one exception - December 1940 issue of "Rycerz Niepokalanej", which aroused the hope of surviving dark time of war). So the Franciscans tried to keep up common prayers and help for the prisoners and numerous refugees.

There was a sawmill, carpentry and dairy, a repair shop for farm machinery, bicycles, watches and many other items. The friars grew their own food, they had livestock, bee hives and chickens. The courses of secret teaching were also held and PCK (Polish Red Cross) circle functioned.

Pilgrimages today 
After the war the printing house in Niepokalanów was reopened and The Knight of the Immaculate was issued again. In 1948-1954 there was built a new church, since April 1980 called basilica minor. In June 1950, according to the decree of Cardinal Stefan Wyszynski, a new parish in Niepokalanów was established (6500 faithful circa). The church and the monastery were visited by Pope John Paul II during his second Pastoral Visit in Poland, on 18 of June 1983.

The visit of the Pope made Niepokalanów famous not only in Poland, but also abroad. The Pope called the monastery a heroic place where saint Maximilian lived and the environment of the Immaculate. Many pilgrims want to visit the place, sacred by activity of St Maximilian, and pray in the local basilica.

They also can see the Museum of St Maximilian (called There was a Man), established in 1998, and a wooden old chapel, one of the first buildings here, constructed in 1927 for the friars and rebuilt two years later so the local faithful could attend the celebrations and services. The monastery became also a place where many religious meeting are held.

See also 
 Basilica of Omni-mediatress of All Glories - history and architecture of basilica minor in Niepokalanów
 Maximilian Kolbe - the life and the activity of St Maximilian Kolbe, founder of Niepokalanów monastery
 Museum of St Maximilian - museum dedicated to St Maximilian Kolbe, evangelisation activity of Niepokalanów and Franciscan missions

Small photo gallery

References

External links 

 English version of the official site
 Travel information
 Life of the founder of Niepokalanów
 The First-Class Relics of St Maximilian Kolbe

Shrines to the Virgin Mary
Catholic Church in Poland
Franciscan monasteries in Poland
Christian organizations established in 1927
Sochaczew County
The Most Holy Virgin Mary, Queen of Poland